Lowell Odell Lundstrom (November 28, 1939 – July 20, 2012) was an American evangelist and musician.

Biography
Lundstrom was born in Minneapolis, Minnesota, United States. At the age of 14 he started a rock and roll band where the same year he met Connie Brown,  who became his future wife. He began his work as a minister on April 7, 1957 at Sisseton, South Dakota and married Brown two months later. In 1996, he and other members of his family founded Celebration Church in Lakeville, Minnesota, and pastored there until his homegoing. Throughout 50 years he had millions of followers and produced 600 gospel songs and 60 albums, for which he was commemorated in the Minnesota Music Hall of Fame in 2005. He died from Parkinson's disease on July 20, 2012, at his home in Savage, Minnesota at the age of 72.

References

1939 births
2012 deaths
American evangelists
American male musicians
American gospel musicians
Clergy from Minneapolis
People from Lakeville, Minnesota
People from Savage, Minnesota
People from Sisseton, South Dakota